Soul Sugar is an album by American jazz organist Jimmy McGriff featuring performances recorded in 1970 and released on the Capitol label.

Reception 

Allmusic's Jason Ankeny said: "The Sonny Lester-produced Soul Sugar looms large in Jimmy McGriff's vast catalog – while it's a fool's errand to pick the organist's absolute funkiest recording, this one demands serious consideration".

Track listing 
All compositions by Jimmy McGriff except where noted
 "Sugar, Sugar" (Jeff Barry, Andy Kim) – 2:45
 "Ain't It Funky Now" (James Brown) – 3:36
 "Signed, Sealed, Delivered I'm Yours" (Stevie Wonder, Lee Garrett, Syreeta Wright, Lula Mae Hardaway) – 2:45
 "Dig on It" – 3:05
 "Bug Out" – 3:01
 "The Now Thing" – 2:50
 "You're the One" (Sylvester Stewart) – 3:10
 "Fat Cakes" (Raymond Greenwood) – 3:18
 "New Volume" – 3:33
 "Spirit in the Dark" (Aretha Franklin) – 2:50

Personnel 
Jimmy McGriff – organ
Murray Watson – trumpet
Cliff Davis – tenor saxophone, flute
Johnny Beard – baritone saxophone
Horace Ott – electric piano
Larry Frazier – guitar 
Richard Davis – bass
Marion J. Booker – drums
Lawrence Killian – congas, tambourine

External link 
 Jimmy McGriff - Soul Sugar

References 

Capitol Records albums
Jimmy McGriff albums
1970 albums
Albums produced by Sonny Lester